Badou is a town in western Togo near the Ghanaian border, in Plateaux Region.  Its main industries are cocoa- and coffee-farming.  The Akloa Falls lie nearby.

Populated places in Plateaux Region, Togo
Ghana–Togo border crossings